Burhan Interchange is located in the west of Hasan Abdal city in Attock District, Pakistan. It allows the traffic to connect to Peshawar, Islamabad, Rawal Pindi, Haripur , Abbottabad and Mansehra. It is located on M1 motorway.

References

Road interchanges in Pakistan